Ribonucleoside-diphosphate reductase large subunit is an enzyme that in humans is encoded by the RRM1 gene.

This gene encodes one of two non-identical subunits which constitute ribonucleoside-diphosphate reductase, an enzyme essential for the production of deoxyribonucleotides prior to DNA synthesis in S phase of dividing cells. It is one of several genes located in the imprinted gene domain of 11p15.5, an important tumor-suppressor gene region. Alterations in this region have been associated with the Beckwith-Wiedemann syndrome, Wilms tumor, rhabdomyosarcoma, adrenocortical carcinoma, and lung, ovarian, and breast cancer. This gene may play a role in malignancies and disease that involve this region. This gene is oriented in a head-to-tail configuration with the stromal interaction molecule 1 gene (STIM1), with the 3' end of STIM1 situated 1.6 kb from the 5' end of this gene.

Interactive pathway map

See also
 Ribonucleotide reductase

References

Further reading

EC 1.17.4